Canterbury is a city located in the county of Kent in southeast England. It may also refer to:

Places

Australia
Canterbury, New South Wales, a suburb of Sydney
Electoral district of Canterbury, an electoral district in the New South Wales Legislative Assembly
City of Canterbury, New South Wales, a local government area of Sydney
Canterbury, Queensland, a small settlement
Canterbury, Victoria, a suburb of Melbourne

Canada
Canterbury, New Brunswick, a village
Canterbury Parish, New Brunswick
Canterbury Falls, Ancaster, Ontario
Urbandale, Ottawa, a neighbourhood in Ottawa sometimes called Canterbury.

New Zealand
Canterbury Region, a region in the South Island of New Zealand
Canterbury Province, a former province of New Zealand
Canterbury Plains
Canterbury Bight, a stretch of coastline

United Kingdom
Canterbury (UK Parliament constituency)
City of Canterbury, the local government district in Kent
Province of Canterbury, one of two ecclesiastical provinces which constitute the Church of England
Diocese of Canterbury, a Church of England diocese
Oriel Square, formerly Canterbury Square, Oxford

United States
Canterbury, Connecticut, a town
Canterbury, Delaware, an unincorporated community
Canterbury, New Hampshire, a town
Canterbury, West Virginia, an unincorporated community

Elsewhere
Canterbury, Jamaica, a squatter suburb of Montego Bay
Canterbury Spur, Marie Byrd Land, Antarctica
3563 Canterbury, an asteroid

Schools
Canterbury Christ Church University, Kent, England
University of Canterbury, Christchurch, New Zealand
Canterbury College (disambiguation)
Canterbury High School (disambiguation)
Canterbury School (disambiguation)
Canterbury University (Seychelles), an unaccredited institution

Music
Canterbury scene, a style of progressive rock that originated in Canterbury, England
Canterbury (album), a 1983 album by Diamond Head
Canterbury (band), an English alternative rock band

Ships
Canterbury (ship), the ship which transported William Penn and James Logan from England to Philadelphia in 1699
HMS Canterbury, several ships of the British Royal Navy
HMNZS Canterbury (F421), a decommissioned New Zealand Navy frigate
HMNZS Canterbury (L421), a multi-role vessel in the New Zealand Navy
, a South Eastern and Chatham Railway ferry

Sports
Canterbury (women's field hockey team), an amateur team in New Zealand
Canterbury Golf Club, a golf club in Ohio, US
Canterbury Open, a darts tournament in Christchurch, New Zealand
Canterbury Park, a horse racing facility in Minnesota, US
Canterbury Rugby Football Union, or Canterbury, the governing body for rugby union in a portion of the Canterbury Region of New Zealand
Canterbury Stakes, an Australian Thoroughbred horse race
Canterbury United Dragons, a men's football team in the New Zealand Football Championship
Canterbury United Pride, a football team in the New Zealand National Women's League
Canterbury-Bankstown Bulldogs, an Australian professional rugby league club that plays in the National Rugby League

People and fictional characters
Chandler Canterbury (born 1998), American child actor and producer
Dave Canterbury (born 1963), American survival expert and television personality
Mark Canterbury (born 1964), known by the ring name Henry O. Godwinn, American professional wrestler
Ray Canterbury (born 1969), American politician
Tim Canterbury, a character in the BBC sitcom The Office

Other uses
Canterbury (furniture), a small piece of furniture made originally to house sheet music
Canterbury of New Zealand, or just Canterbury, a UK-based sports clothing company
Canterbury Hospital, Campsie, Sydney, New South Wales, Australia
Kent and Canterbury Hospital, Canterbury, Kent, England
Canterbury Hotel, Indianapolis, Indiana, US, on the National Register of Historic Places (NRHP)
Canterbury Presbyterian Church, Cornwall, New York, US, on the NRHP
Canterbury Road, North Oxford, England
HM Prison Canterbury, a former prison in Canterbury, Kent, England
Viscount Canterbury, an extinct title in the Peerage of the United Kingdom
Canterbury power station

See also

Project Canterbury, an online archive of material related to the history of Anglicanism